Bitburg is an electoral constituency (German: Wahlkreis) represented in the Bundestag. It elects one member via first-past-the-post voting. Under the current constituency numbering system, it is designated as constituency 202. It is located in northwestern Rhineland-Palatinate, comprising the Bitburg-Prüm district, Vulkaneifel district, and the northern part of the Bernkastel-Wittlich district.

Bitburg was created for the inaugural 1949 federal election. Since 2009, it has been represented by Patrick Schnieder of the Christian Democratic Union (CDU).

Geography
Bitburg is located in northwestern Rhineland-Palatinate. As of the 2021 federal election, it comprises the entirety of the Bitburg-Prüm and Vulkaneifel districts as well as, from the Bernkastel-Wittlich district, the municipality of Wittlich, the Verbandsgemeinde of Wittlich-Land, and the municipalities of Bausendorf, Bengel, Diefenbach, Flußbach, Hontheim, Kinderbeuern, Kinheim, Kröv, Reil, and Willwerscheid from the Traben-Trarbach Verbandsgemeinde.

History
Bitburg was created in 1949, then known as Prüm. It acquired its current name in the 1965 election. In the 1949 election, it was Rhineland-Palatinate constituency 6 in the numbering system. In the 1953 through 1976 elections, it was number 153. In the 1980 through 1998 elections, it was number 151. In the 2002 election, it was number 205. In the 2005 election, it was number 204. In the 2009 and 2013 elections, it was number 203. Since the 2017 election, it has been number 202.

Originally, the constituency comprised the districts of Bitburg, Prüm, Daun, and Wittlich. It acquired its current borders in the 1965 election, although when the former Verbandsgemeinde of Kröv-Bausendorf was merged into the Traben-Trarbach Verbandsgemeinde in 2014, only its area remained in the constituency.

Members
The constituency has been held continuously by the Christian Democratic Union (CDU) since its creation. It was first represented by Matthias Joseph Mehs from 1949 to 1953, followed by Hans Richarts from 1953 to 1972. Alois Mertes then served from 1972 to 1987. Peter Rauen was representative from 1987 to 2009. Patrick Schnieder was elected in 2009, and re-elected in 2013, 2017, and 2021.

Election results

2021 election

2017 election

2013 election

2009 election

References

Federal electoral districts in Rhineland-Palatinate
1949 establishments in West Germany
Constituencies established in 1949
Bitburg-Prüm
Vulkaneifel
Bernkastel-Wittlich